Ahmed Moor (born in the Gaza Strip c. 1985) is a Palestinian-American writer, finance expert, and a founder of liwwa, Inc. He co-edited the book After Zionism: One State for Israel and Palestine which was published by Saqi Books in 2012.

Early life and education
Moor was born in the Rafah refugee camp in the Gaza Strip. In regards to living in Palestine, Moor wrote in a September 2009 Electronic Intifada article that the "occupation looms large over everything in Palestine" and armed men "patrol your neighborhoods, detain your family and neighbors and dictate exactly when you can leave your house. ... You learn before long that the men with guns are Jews—and the people living in the beautiful homes on the hills behind barbed wire are Jews. The language on your milk carton is Hebrew. Not long after that, you begin to ask why things are the way they are." Moor wrote that his grandfather had lived in Beer al-Sabaa in May 1948 and had been driven out of his house at gunpoint by Zionists who he said "Judaized" the village and renamed it Be'er Sheva. He rejected the "soft Zionists" who take the position that there is "nothing wrong with Israel's existence, even at the expense of another people."

Moor received a BA from the University of Pennsylvania in 2006. After spending three years working in finance in New York, he worked as a journalist in Beirut, Lebanon, where he wrote about politics, human rights, Palestine, and migration. He won a P.D. Soros Fellowship and received a Master in Public Policy from Harvard University in 2013.

Journalism and books

Journalism
Moor's writing has appeared in the Huffington Post, The Guardian, the Boston Review, Al Jazeera, the London Review of Books, the Daily Beast, Mondoweiss, Electronic Intifada, The Philadelphia Inquirer, and elsewhere.

After Zionism
Moor is the co-editor of After Zionism: One State for Israel and Palestine (2012), which argues for a one-state solution to the Israeli–Palestinian conflict. "Time has run out for the two-state solution because of the unending and permanent Jewish colonization of Palestinian land," reads the publisher's description of the book. "Although deep mistrust exists on both sides of the conflict, growing numbers of Palestinians and Israelis, Jews and Arabs are working together to forge a different, unified future."

He and his co-editor, Anthony Lowenstein, write in the book that they do not agree on everything, but that they share a belief that "Jews and Palestinians are destined to work together, whatever our differences in background, ideals and daily life. We are connected with our desire to see peace with justice for our peoples." Moor himself has said that he and his co-editor "adapted a one-state paradigm mainly because one state exists today. Israel/Palestine is an apartheid state." He has said that he and Lowenstein are primarily concerned not with questions of identity and different value systems but with "the empirical reality." Moor criticizes "the persistence of this two-state idea," describing it as "an article of faith" that "has very little to do...with the reality on the ground."

"The very title will be off-putting to almost all supporters of Israel," Publishers Weekly said in a review of After Zionism, but said that the book "offers valuable contributions to a debate that should be front and center, yet is confined to ever-smaller margins."

One State Conference
Moor was an organizer of a "One State Conference" at Harvard University in March 2012. Its stated goal was "to educate ourselves and others about the possible contours of a one-state solution and the challenges that stand in the way of its realization." Speakers at the conference included Ali Abunimah, a journalist and co-founder of The Electronic Intifada website, Professor Susan Akram, who directs Boston University Law’s International Human Rights Clinic, and Rabbi Brant Rosen, the rabbi of Tzedek Chicago. Penny Schwartz, writing for the Jewish Telegraphic Agency, said critics regarded the conference as "a thinly veiled assault on the legitimacy of the Jewish state", a view that the organizers regarded as amounting to "thinly veiled attempts to silence any criticism of Israel".

liwwa.com
In November 2013, Moor co-founded liwwa.com, a peer-to-peer lending network designed to help connect small businesses in need of capital with people wanting to invest, "all in conformity with Islamic financial regulations." He was CEO of liwaa for six years, during which time the company grew from a small, two-person endeavor into a "50-person business with millions of dollars in annual sales and revenue."

References

External links
 
Huffington Post Profile

Living people
American people of Palestinian descent
Palestinian journalists
American male journalists
1985 births
American political commentators
Palestinian political writers
Palestinian human rights activists
Harvard Kennedy School alumni